The 1980 Torneo Godó or Trofeo Conde de Godó was a men's tennis tournament that took place on outdoor clay courts at the Real Club de Tenis Barcelona in Barcelona, Catalonia, Spain. It was the 28th edition of the tournament and was part of the 1980 Grand Prix circuit. It was held from 6 October through 12 October 1980. Second-seeded Ivan Lendl won the singles title. Björn Borg, winner in 1975 and 1977, withdrew two days before the start of the event due to a knee injury.

Finals

Singles
 Ivan Lendl defeated  Guillermo Vilas 6–4, 5–7, 6–4, 4–6, 6–1
 It was Lendl's 3rd singles title of the year and of his career.

Doubles
 Steve Denton /  Ivan Lendl defeated  Pavel Složil /  Balázs Taróczy 6–2, 6–7, 6–3

References

External links
 ITF tournament edition details
 ATP tournament profile
 Official tournament website

Barcelona Open (tennis)
Torneo Godo
Torneo Godo
Torneo Godo